The 2016–17 Cleveland Cavaliers season was the 47th season of the franchise in the National Basketball Association (NBA). For the first time in franchise history, the Cavaliers entered the season as the defending NBA champions, having defeated the Golden State Warriors in seven games in the NBA Finals where they came back from a 3–1 deficit, becoming the first team in NBA Finals history to do so. The Cavaliers also broke the record of most made three-pointers in a regular season game with 25 against the Atlanta Hawks.

The Cavaliers finished the regular season with a 51–31 record, securing the 2nd seed. In the playoffs, the Cavaliers defeated and swept the Indiana Pacers in four games in the First Round, advancing to the Semi-finals. They then defeated and swept the Toronto Raptors in four games, advancing to the Eastern Conference Finals.   They defeated the Boston Celtics in five games to advance to the NBA Finals for the third straight season. In the 2017 NBA Finals, the Cavaliers faced off against the Golden State Warriors for the third consecutive year, becoming the first two teams to meet three consecutive times in the NBA Finals. The Cavaliers would lose in five games against the Warriors in the NBA Finals.

After the season, David Griffin left as general manager and after hearing about trade rumors, most notably a 3-team deal that was confirmed by team and league sources that would've sent Paul George and Eric Bledsoe to the Cavaliers and Kyrie Irving and Channing Frye to the Phoenix Suns, Irving, not being content about the situation and per his request, was traded to the Boston Celtics for Jae Crowder, Isaiah Thomas, Ante Žižić, a 2018 1st round draft pick (Collin Sexton was later selected), and a 2020 2nd round draft pick (Skylar Mays was later selected) was added as compensation for Isaiah Thomas's injury. This trade ended the superteam era of the Cavaliers.

Offseason

Draft

Notes

Roster

Standings

Division

Conference

Game log

Preseason

|- style="background-color:#cfc
| 1
| October 5
| Orlando
| 117–102
| Jordan McRae (20)
| Cory Jefferson (11)
| LeBron James (6)
| Quicken Loans Arena18,789
| 1–0
|- style="background-color:#cfc
| 2
| October 8
| Philadelphia
| 108–105
| Jordan McRae (20)
| Chris Andersen (6)
| Chris Andersen, Jordan McRae (4)
| Quicken Loans Arena19,694
| 2–0
|- style="background-color:#fbb
| 3
| October 10
| @ Atlanta
| 93–99
| Felder, Holmes (15)
| Cory Jefferson (11)
| Kay Felder (6)
| Philips Arena16,202
| 2–1
|- style="background-color:#fbb
| 4
| October 13
| Toronto
| 94–119
| Kevin Love (19)
| Liggins, Love (5)
| Kyrie Irving (8)
| Quicken Loans Arena18,834
| 2–2
|- style="background-color:#fbb
| 5
| October 14
| @ Chicago
| 108–118
| John Holland (23)
| Jonathan Holmes (6)
| Kay Felder (7)
| United Center21,766
| 2–3
|- style="background-color:#fbb
| 6
| October 18
| Washington
| 91–96
| LeBron James (18)
| Tristan Thompson (10)
| Iman Shumpert (5)
| Value City Arena18,104
| 2–4

Regular season

|- style="background:#bfb;"
| 1
| October 25
| New York
| 117–88
| Kyrie Irving (29)
| Kevin Love (12)
| LeBron James (14)
| Quicken Loans Arena20,562
| 1–0
|- style="background:#bfb;"
| 2
| October 28
| @ Toronto
| 94–91
| Kyrie Irving (26)
| Love, Thompson (10)
| LeBron James (7)
| Air Canada Centre19,800
| 2–0
|- style="background:#bfb;"
| 3
| October 29
| Orlando
| 105–99
| LeBron James (23)
| Tristan Thompson (12)
| LeBron James (9)
| Quicken Loans Arena20,562
| 3–0

|- style="background:#bfb;"
| 4
| November 1
| Houston
| 128–120
| Kyrie Irving (32)
| LeBron James (13)
| LeBron James (8)
| Quicken Loans Arena 20,562
| 4–0
|- style= "background:#bfb;"
| 5
| November 3
| Boston
| 128–122
| LeBron James (30)
| Tristan Thompson (14)
| LeBron James (12)
| Quicken Loans Arena 20,562
| 5–0
|- style= "background:#bfb;"
| 6
| November 5
| @ Philadelphia
| 102–101
| LeBron James (25)
| Tristan Thompson (13)
| LeBron James (14)
| Wells Fargo Center 20,497
| 6–0
|- style= "background:#fbb;"
| 7
| November 8
| Atlanta
| 106–110
| Kyrie Irving (29)
| Kevin Love (12)
| LeBron James (5)
| Quicken Loans Arena 20,562
| 6–1
|- style= "background:#bfb;"
| 8
| November 11
| @ Washington
| 105–94
| Kyrie Irving (29)
| Kevin Love (16)
| Kyrie Irving (6)
| Verizon Center 20,356
| 7–1
|- style= "background:#bfb;"
| 9
| November 13
| Charlotte
| 100–93
| Channing Frye (20)
| Tristan Thompson (12)
| LeBron James (8)
| Quicken Loans Arena 20,562
| 8–1
|- style= "background:#bfb;"
| 10
| November 15
| Toronto
| 121–117
| LeBron James (28)
| Kevin Love (13)
| LeBron James (14)
| Quicken Loans Arena 20,562
| 9–1
|- style= "background:#fbb;"
| 11
| November 16
| @ Indiana
| 93–103
| Kevin Love (27)
| Kevin Love (16)
| Kyrie Irving (7)
| Bankers Life Fieldhouse 17,923
| 9–2
|- style= "background:#bfb;"
| 12
| November 18
| Detroit
| 104–81
| Kyrie Irving (25)
| Tristan Thompson (14)
| Kyrie Irving (11)
| Quicken Loans Arena 20,562
| 10–2
|- style= "background:#bfb;"
| 13
| November 23
| Portland
| 137–125
| Kevin Love (40)
| LeBron James (10)
| LeBron James (13)
| Quicken Loans Arena 20,562
| 11–2
|- style= "background:#bfb;"
| 14
| November 25
| Dallas
| 128–90
| Kevin Love (27)
| Tristan Thompson (12)
| LeBron James (11)
| Quicken Loans Arena 20,562
| 12–2
|- style="background:#bfb;"
| 15
| November 27
| @ Philadelphia
| 112–108
| Kyrie Irving (39)
| Tristan Thompson (12)
| LeBron James (13)
| Wells Fargo Center 20,497
| 13–2
|- style="background:#fbb;"
| 16
| November 29
| @ Milwaukee
| 101–118
| LeBron James (22)
| Kevin Love (13)
| LeBron James (4)
| Bradley Center 18,717
| 13–3

|- style= "background:#fbb;"
| 17
| December 1
| L.A. Clippers
| 94–113
| Kyrie Irving (28)
| Tristan Thompson (8)
| LeBron James (5)
| Quicken Loans Arena 20,562
| 13–4
|- style="background:#fbb;"
| 18
| December 2
| @ Chicago
| 105–111
| LeBron James (27)
| Kevin Love (19)
| LeBron James (13)
| United Center 21,775
| 13–5
|- style= "background:#bfb;"
| 19
| December 5
| @ Toronto
| 116–112
| LeBron James (34)
| Love, Thompson (14)
| LeBron James (7)
| Air Canada Centre 19,800
| 14–5
|- style= "background:#bfb;"
| 20
| December 7
| @ New York
| 126–94
| Kyrie Irving (28)
| Tristan Thompson (20)
| LeBron James (7)
| Madison Square Garden 19,812
| 15–5
|- style= "background:#bfb;"
| 21
| December 9
| Miami
| 114–84
| Kevin Love (28)
| Kevin Love (15)
| LeBron James (8)
| Quicken Loans Arena 20,562
| 16–5
|- style= "background:#bfb;"
| 22
| December 10
| Charlotte
| 116–105
| LeBron James (44)
| Tristan Thompson (12)
| LeBron James (10)
| Quicken Loans Arena 20,562
| 17–5
|- style= "background:#bfb;"
| 23
| December 13
| Memphis
| 103–86
| Kevin Love (29)
| Kevin Love (13)
| LeBron James (8)
| Quicken Loans Arena 20,562
| 18–5
|- style= "background:#fbb;"
| 24
| December 14
| @ Memphis
| 85–93
| James Jones (15)
| Tristan Thompson (11)
| Kay Felder (4)
| FedEx Forum 17,449
| 18–6
|- style= "background:#bfb;"
| 25
| December 17
| L.A. Lakers
| 119–108
| Kevin Love (24)
| Kevin Love (17)
| Kyrie Irving (12)
| Quicken Loans Arena 20,562
| 19–6
|- style= "background:#bfb;"
| 26
| December 20
| @ Milwaukee
| 114–108 (OT)
| LeBron James (34)
| James, Thompson (12)
| LeBron James (7)
| BMO Harris Bradley Center 17,053
| 20–6
|- style= "background:#bfb;"
| 27
| December 21
| Milwaukee
| 113–102
| Kyrie Irving (31)
| Tristan Thompson (15)
| Kyrie Irving (13)
| Quicken Loans Arena 20,562
| 21–6
|- style= "background:#bfb;"
| 28
| December 23
| Brooklyn
| 119–99
| LeBron James (19)
| Kevin Love (15)
| LeBron James (10)
| Quicken Loans Arena 20,562
| 22–6
|- style= "background:#bfb;"
| 29
| December 25
| Golden State
| 109–108
| LeBron James (31)
| LeBron James (13)
| Kyrie Irving (10)
| Quicken Loans Arena 20,562
| 23–6
|- style= "background:#fbb;"
| 30
| December 26
| @ Detroit
| 90–106
| Kyrie Irving (18)
| Kevin Love (14)
| Kyrie Irving (8)
| The Palace of Auburn Hills 18,123
| 23–7
|- style= "background:#bfb;"
| 31
| December 29
| Boston
| 124–118
| Kyrie Irving (32)
| Kevin Love (15)
| Kyrie Irving (12)
| Quicken Loans Arena 20,562
| 24–7
|- style= "background:#bfb;"
| 32
| December 31
| @ Charlotte
| 121–109
| LeBron James (32)
| Kevin Love (10)
| LeBron James (9)
| Spectrum Center 19,519
| 25–7

|- style= "background:#bfb;"
| 33
| January 2
| New Orleans
| 90–82
| LeBron James (26)
| Richard Jefferson (12)
| LeBron James (6)
| Quicken Loans Arena 20,562
| 26–7
|- style= "background:#fbb;"
| 34
| January 4
| Chicago
| 94–106
| LeBron James (31)
| Tristan Thompson (11)
| LeBron James (7)
| Quicken Loans Arena 20,562
| 26–8
|- style= "background:#bfb;"
| 35
| January 6
| @ Brooklyn
| 116–108
| LeBron James (36)
| Kevin Love (13)
| LeBron James (6)
| Barclays Center17,732
| 27–8
|- style= "background:#bfb;"
| 36
| January 8
| @ Phoenix
| 120–116
| LeBron James (28)
| Love, Thompson (10)
| Kyrie Irving (7)
| Talking Stick Resort Arena18,055
| 28–8
|- style= "background:#fbb;"
| 37
| January 10
| @ Utah
| 92–100
| LeBron James (29)
| Tristan Thompson (12)
| LeBron James (5)
| Vivint Smart Home Arena19,911
| 28–9
|- style= "background:#fbb;"
| 38
| January 11
| @ Portland
| 86–102
| LeBron James (20)
| LeBron James (11)
| LeBron James (4)
| Moda Center17,212
| 28–10
|- style= "background:#bfb;"
| 39
| January 13
| @ Sacramento
| 120–108
| Kyrie Irving (26)
| Kevin Love (18)
| LeBron James (15)
| Golden 1 Center17,156
| 29–10
|- style= "background:#fbb;"
| 40
| January 16
| @ Golden State
| 91–126
| LeBron James (20)
| LeBron James (8)
| Kay Felder (3)
| Oracle Arena19,596
| 29–11
|- style= "background:#bfb;"
| 41
| January 19
| Phoenix
| 118–103
| Kyrie Irving (26)
| LeBron James (9)
| LeBron James (15)
| Quicken Loans Arena 20,562
| 30–11
|- style= "background:#fbb;"
| 42
| January 21
| San Antonio
| 115–118
| James, Irving (29)
| Tristan Thompson (12)
| Kyrie Irving (9)
| Quicken Loans Arena 20,562
| 30–12
|- style= "background:#fbb;"
| 43
| January 23
| @ New Orleans
| 122–124
| Kyrie Irving (49)
| Kevin Love (16)
| LeBron James (12)
| Smoothie King Center17,758
| 30–13
|- style= "background:#fbb;"
| 44
| January 25
| Sacramento
| 112–116 (OT)
| LeBron James (24)
| Kevin Love (16)
| LeBron James (11)
| Quicken Loans Arena 20,562
| 30–14
|- style= "background:#bfb;"
| 45
| January 27
| Brooklyn
| 124–116
| LeBron James (31)
| Kevin Love (14)
| LeBron James (11)
| Quicken Loans Arena 20,562
| 31–14
|- style= "background:#bfb;"
| 46
| January 29
| Oklahoma City
| 107–91
| Kyrie Irving (29)
| LeBron James (14)
| Kyrie Irving (10)
| Quicken Loans Arena 20,562
| 32–14
|- style= "background:#fbb;"
| 47
| January 30
| @ Dallas
| 97–104
| LeBron James (23)
| LeBron James (9)
| LeBron James (9)
| American Airlines Center20,202
| 32–15

|- style= "background:#bfb;"
| 48
| February 1
| Minnesota
| 125–97
| LeBron James (27)
| Tristan Thompson (14)
| Kyrie Irving (14)
| Quicken Loans Arena 20,562
| 33–15
|- style= "background:#bfb;"
| 49
| February 4
| @ New York
| 111–104
| LeBron James (32)
| Kevin Love (15)
| LeBron James (10)
| Madison Square Garden19,812
| 34–15
|- style= "background:#bfb;"
| 50
| February 6
| @ Washington
| 140–135 (OT)
| Kevin Love (39)
| Love, Thompson (12)
| LeBron James (17)
| Verizon Center20,356
| 35–15
|- style= "background:#bfb;"
| 51
| February 8
| @ Indiana
| 132–117
| Irving, Korver (29)
| Love, Thompson (10)
| LeBron James (9)
| Bankers Life Fieldhouse17,580
| 36–15
|- style= "background:#fbb;"
| 52
| February 9
| @ Oklahoma City
| 109–118
| Kyrie Irving (28)
| Kevin Love (12)
| LeBron James (7)
| Chesapeake Energy Arena18,203
| 36–16
|- style= "background:#bfb;"
| 53
| February 11
| Denver
| 125–109
| James, Irving (27)
| Tristan Thompson (13)
| LeBron James (12)
| Quicken Loans Arena 20,562
| 37–16
|- style= "background:#bfb;"
| 54
| February 14
| @ Minnesota
| 116–108
| James, Irving (25)
| Tristan Thompson (11)
| LeBron James (14)
| Target Center17,738
| 38–16
|- style= "background:#bfb;"
| 55
| February 15
| Indiana
| 113–104
| LeBron James (31)
| Tristan Thompson (12)
| Kyrie Irving (7)
| Quicken Loans Arena 20,562
| 39–16
|- style= "background:#bfb;"
| 56
| February 23
| New York
| 119–104
| Kyrie Irving (23)
| Tristan Thompson (15)
| LeBron James (14)
| Quicken Loans Arena 20,562
| 40–16
|- style= "background:#fbb;"
| 57
| February 25
| Chicago
| 99–117
| Kyrie Irving (34)
| Irving, Thompson (9)
| Kyrie Irving (7)
| Quicken Loans Arena 20,562
| 40–17
|- style="background:#bfb;"
| 58
| February 27
| Milwaukee
| 102–95
| Kyrie Irving (25)
| LeBron James (10)
| LeBron James (6)
| Quicken Loans Arena 20,562
| 41–17

|- style= "background:#fbb;"
| 59
| March 1
| @ Boston
| 99–103
| LeBron James (28)
| James, Thompson (13)
| LeBron James (10)
| TD Garden18,624
| 41–18
|- style= "background:#bfb;"
| 60
| March 3
| @ Atlanta
| 135–130
| Kyrie Irving (43)
| LeBron James (13)
| Kyrie Irving (9)
| Philips Arena18,877
| 42–18
|- style= "background:#fbb;"
| 61
| March 4
| @ Miami
| 92–120
| Channing Frye (21)
| DeAndre Liggins (8)
| Deron Williams (7)
| AmericanAirlines Arena19,600
| 42–19
|- style= "background:#fbb;"
| 62
| March 6
| Miami
| 98–106
| Kyrie Irving (32)
| LeBron James (17)
| LeBron James (6)
| Quicken Loans Arena 20,562
| 42–20
|- style= "background:#fbb;"
| 63
| March 9
| @ Detroit
| 101–106
| LeBron James (29)
| LeBron James (13)
| LeBron James (10)
| The Palace of Auburn Hills19,421
| 42–21
|- style= "background:#bfb;"
| 64
| March 11
| @ Orlando
| 116–104
| LeBron James (24)
| Tristan Thompson (13)
| LeBron James (13)
| Amway Center18,846
| 43–21
|- style= "background:#fbb;"
| 65
| March 12
| @ Houston
| 112–117
| LeBron James (30)
| Tristan Thompson (8)
| Kyrie Irving (8)
| Toyota Center18,055
| 43–22
|- style= "background:#bfb;"
| 66
| March 14
| Detroit
| 128–96
| Kyrie Irving (26)
| LeBron James (11)
| LeBron James (12)
| Quicken Loans Arena 20,562
| 44–22
|- style= "background:#bfb;"
| 67
| March 16
| Utah
| 91–83
| LeBron James (33)
| LeBron James (10)
| LeBron James (6)
| Quicken Loans Arena 20,562
| 45–22
|- style= "background:#fbb;"
| 68
| March 18
| @ L.A. Clippers
| 78–108
| Richard Jefferson (12)
| Jefferson, Smith, Thompson (6)
| Deron Williams (5)
| Staples Center19,096
| 45–23
|- style= "background:#bfb;"
| 69
| March 19
| @ L.A. Lakers
| 125–120
| Kyrie Irving (46)
| Kevin Love (15)
| LeBron James (7)
| Staples Center19,812
| 46–23
|- style= "background:#fbb;"
| 70
| March 22
| @ Denver
| 113–126
| Kyrie Irving (33)
| Kevin Love (7)
| LeBron James (5)
| Pepsi Center19,718
| 46–24
|- style= "background:#bfb;"
| 71
| March 24
| @ Charlotte
| 112–105
| LeBron James (32)
| Kevin Love (11)
| LeBron James (12)
| Spectrum Center19,511
| 47–24
|- style= "background:#fbb;"
| 72
| March 25
| Washington
| 115–127
| LeBron James (24)
| LeBron James (11)
| LeBron James (8)
| Quicken Loans Arena 20,562
| 47–25
|- style= "background:#fbb;"
| 73
| March 27
| @ San Antonio
| 74–103
| LeBron James (17)
| LeBron James (8)
| LeBron James (8)
| AT&T Center18,418
| 47–26
|- style= "background:#fbb;"
| 74
| March 30
| @ Chicago
| 93–99
| LeBron James (26)
| James, Love (10)
| LeBron James (8)
| United Center22,282
| 47–27
|- style= "background:#bfb;"
| 75
| March 31
| Philadelphia
| 122–105
| LeBron James (34)
| Tristan Thompson (11)
| Kyrie Irving (9)
| Quicken Loans Arena 20,562
| 48–27

|- style= "background:#bfb;"
| 76
| April 2
| Indiana
| 135–130 (2OT)
| LeBron James (41)
| LeBron James (16)
| LeBron James (11)
| Quicken Loans Arena 20,562
| 49–27
|- style= "background:#bfb;"
| 77
| April 4
| Orlando
| 122–102
| Kevin Love (28)
| James, Love (11)
| LeBron James (11)
| Quicken Loans Arena 20,562
| 50–27
|- style= "background:#bfb;"
| 78
| April 5
| @ Boston
| 114–91
| LeBron James (36)
| Kevin Love (16)
| LeBron James (6)
| TD Garden 18,624
| 51–27
|- style= "background:#fbb;"
| 79
| April 7
| Atlanta
| 100–114
| LeBron James (27)
| Kevin Love (15)
| Irving, James (7)
| Quicken Loans Arena20,562
| 51–28
|- style= "background:#fbb;"
| 80
| April 9
| @ Atlanta
| 125–126 (OT)
| Kyrie Irving (45)
| LeBron James (16)
| LeBron James (10)
| Philips Arena18,688
| 51–29
|- style= "background:#fbb;"
| 81
| April 10
| @ Miami
| 121–124 (OT)
| Deron Williams (35)
| Kevin Love (10)
| Deron Williams (9)
| AmericanAirlines Arena19,673
| 51–30
|- style= "background:#fbb;"
| 82
| April 12
| Toronto
| 83–98
| Iman Shumpert (11)
| Walter Tavares (10)
|Deron Williams (4)
| Quicken Loans Arena 20,562
| 51–31

Playoffs

|- style="background:#bfb;"
| 1
| April 15
| Indiana
| 109–108
| LeBron James (32)
| Tristan Thompson (13)
| LeBron James (13)
| Quicken Loans Arena20,562
| 1–0
|- style="background:#bfb;"
| 2
| April 17
| Indiana
| 117–111
| Kyrie Irving (37)
| Kevin Love (11)
| LeBron James (7)
| Quicken Loans Arena20,562
| 2–0
|- style="background:#bfb;"
| 3
| April 20
| @ Indiana
| 119–114
| LeBron James (41)
| LeBron James (13)
| LeBron James (12)
| Bankers Life Fieldhouse17,923
| 3–0
|- style="background:#bfb;"
| 4
| April 23
| @ Indiana
| 106–102
| LeBron James (33)
| Kevin Love (16)
| LeBron James (4)
| Bankers Life Fieldhouse17,923
| 4–0
|-

|- style="background:#bfb;"
| 1
| May 1
| Toronto
| 116–105
| LeBron James (35)
| Tristan Thompson (14)
| Kyrie Irving (10)
| Quicken Loans Arena20,562
| 1–0
|- style="background:#bfb;"
| 2
| May 3
| Toronto
| 125–103
| LeBron James (39)
| Tristan Thompson (9)
| Kyrie Irving (11)
| Quicken Loans Arena20,562
| 2–0
|- style="background:#bfb;"
| 3
| May 5
| @ Toronto
| 115–94
| LeBron James (35)
| Kevin Love (13)
| LeBron James (7)
| Air Canada Centre20,354
| 3–0
|- style="background:#bfb;"
| 4
| May 7
| @ Toronto
| 109–102
| LeBron James (35)
| LeBron James (9)
| Kyrie Irving (9)
| Air Canada Centre20,307
| 4–0

|- style="background:#bfb;"
| 1
| May 17
| @ Boston
| 117–104
| LeBron James (38)
| Kevin Love (12)
| LeBron James (7)
| TD Garden18,624
| 1–0
|- style="background:#bfb;"
| 2
| May 19
| @ Boston
| 130–86
| LeBron James (30)
| Kevin Love (12)
| LeBron James (7)
| TD Garden18,624
| 2–0
|- style="background:#fbb;"
| 3
| May 21
| Boston
| 108–111
| Kyrie Irving (29)
| Tristan Thompson (13)
| Kyrie Irving (7)
| Quicken Loans Arena20,562
| 2–1
|- style="background:#bfb;"
| 4
| May 23
| Boston
| 112–99
| Kyrie Irving (42)
| Kevin Love (17)
| LeBron James (6)
| Quicken Loans Arena20,562
| 3–1
|- style="background:#bfb;"
| 5
| May 25
| @ Boston
| 135–102
| LeBron James (35)
| Kevin Love (11)
| LeBron James (8)
| TD Garden18,624
| 4–1

|- style="background:#fbb;"
| 1
| June 1
| @ Golden State
| 91–113
| LeBron James (28)
| Kevin Love (21)
| LeBron James (8)
| Oracle Arena19,596
| 0–1
|- style="background:#fbb;"
| 2
| June 4
| @ Golden State
| 113–132
| LeBron James (29)
| LeBron James (11)
| LeBron James (14)
| Oracle Arena19,596
| 0–2
|- style="background:#fbb;"
| 3
| June 7
| Golden State
| 113–118
| LeBron James (39)
| Kevin Love (13)
| LeBron James (9)
| Quicken Loans Arena20,562
| 0–3
|- style="background:#bfb;"
| 4
| June 9
| Golden State
| 137–116
| Kyrie Irving (40)
| James, Thompson (11)
| LeBron James (10)
| Quicken Loans Arena20,562
| 1–3
|- style="background:#fbb;"
| 5
| June 12
| @ Golden State
| 120–129
| LeBron James (41)
| LeBron James (13)
| LeBron James (8)
| Oracle Arena19,596
| 1–4

Transactions

Trades

Free agency

Re-signed

Additions

Subtractions

Notes

References

Cleveland Cavaliers seasons
Cleveland Cavaliers
Cleveland Cavaliers
Cleveland Cavaliers
Eastern Conference (NBA) championship seasons